Tonguç is a male name of Turkish origin.

Given name

 Tonguç Baba - Turkish author
 Tonguç Baykurt - Turkish illustrator, writer, director
 Tonguç Türsan - Turkish rower
 Tonguç Vural - Turkish musician

Surname

 Burhan Tonguç, Turkish musician
 İsmail Hakkı Tonguç, Turkish educator

Turkish masculine given names